Trenter is a surname. Notable people with the surname include:

Laura Trenter (born 1961), Swedish author, daughter of Stieg and Ulla
Stieg Trenter (1914–1967), Swedish journalist and crime writer
Ulla Trenter (1936–2019), Swedish author